The Mark Twain Golf Course is a public 18 hole golf course in the Town of Horseheads that is owned and operated by the City of Elmira, New York.  It was designed by the famous golf course architect Donald Ross. It was built in 1937 as a public works project during the Great Depression by the Works Progress Administration. The course was named after Mark Twain, who lived nearby.

References

Sports venues in Chemung County, New York
Golf clubs and courses in New York (state)
Golf clubs and courses designed by Donald Ross
1937 establishments in New York (state)